General elections were held in Jamaica under the Old Representative System between the 17th and 19th centuries. The first elections were held in 1677, in which thirty-two members were elected from 15 constituencies. The House of Assembly was abolished in 1865.

Results

1677

References

Elections in Jamaica
Elections
Elections
Elections
Jamaica
Jamaica
Jamaica